Yantra India Limited is an Indian major state-owned defence production PSU, headquartered in Nagpur, India. Established in 2021 as part of the government’s restructuring and corporatisation of the Ordnance Factory Board into seven different Public Sector Undertakings - the company consists of eight defence manufacturing factory units indigenously catering to the needs of supplies, arms, explosives, artillery and munition for the Indian Armed Forces.

Yantra India consists of the following seven factories of the erstwhile Ordnance Factory Board:

Product 

 Pinaka multi-barrel rocket launcher.

See also
Other PSUs formed from Ordnance Factory Board:-
Advanced Weapons and Equipment India Limited (AWE), Kanpur
Armoured Vehicles Nigam Limited (AVANI), Chennai
Gliders India Limited (GIL), Kanpur
India Optel Limited (IOL), Dehradun
Munitions India Limited (MIL), Pune
Troop Comforts Limited (TCL), Kanpur

References

Defence companies of India
Government-owned companies of India
Indian companies established in 2021